Triton Bay is an Arctic waterway in Qikiqtaaluk Region, Nunavut, Canada. It is located in Norwegian Bay off Devon Island's Grinnell Peninsula. Bere Bay is to the northwest.

References

 Triton Bay, Nunavut at Atlas of Canada

Bays of Qikiqtaaluk Region